HMAS Eduardo was an auxiliary vessel operated by the Royal Australian Navy (RAN) during the Second World War. She was the Royal Navy's MFV 2045, which was loaned to the RAN and commissioned on 8 March 1945. She was used by the Services Reconnaissance Department and was paid off in October 1945 and handed back to the Royal Navy.

Notes

References
Naval Historical Society of Australia - "On this day" (1945)

Auxiliary ships of the Royal Australian Navy
1940s ships